Princess Pan (潘王妃) (968–989) was the first wife of the future Emperor Zhenzong of Song in imperial China's Song Dynasty.  They married in 984 when he was still the Prince of Han (韓王), and she was given the title "Lady of Ju" (莒国夫人).  She was posthumously honoured as Empress Zhanghuai (章懷皇后) after her husband became the emperor in 998.

She was the second daughter and eighth child of the Song general Pan Mei.

Titles

 During the reign of Emperor Taizu of Song (4 February 960– 14 November 976):
 Lady Pan (潘氏; ; from 968)
 During the reign of Emperor Taizong of Song (15 November 976 – 8 May 997)
 Lady of Ju State (莒国夫人; from 983)
During the reign of Emperor Zhenzong of Song (8 May 997 – 23 March 1022 )
 Empress Zhanghuai  (莊怀皇后/章懷皇后 from 997)

References
 Toqto'a et al., History of Song, vol. 242 (Empress Zhanghuai Pan) 

968 births
989 deaths
Song dynasty posthumous empresses
People from Changsha